Wirapong Wannasiri is a Thai footballer.

References

External links
Player Profile on 7M
Player Profile on SMM Online

Living people
Wirapong Wannasiri
Wirapong Wannasiri
1983 births
Association football defenders
Wirapong Wannasiri
Wirapong Wannasiri